The Minister of the Interior and Kingdom Relations is the head of the Ministry of the Interior and Kingdom Relations and a member of the Cabinet and the Council of Ministers. The incumbent minister is Hanke Bruins Slot of the Christian Democratic Appeal (CDA) party who has been in office since 10 January 2022. Regularly a State Secretary is assigned to the Ministry who is tasked with specific portfolios. The current State Secretary is Alexandra van Huffelen of the Democrats 66 (D66) party who also has been in office since 10 January 2022 and has been assigned the portfolios of Kingdom Relations, Local Government and Digital Government. Occasionally there is also a Minister without Portfolio assigned to the Ministry who is also giving specific portfolios. The current Minister without Portfolio is Hugo de Jonge of the Christian Democratic Appeal (CDA) party and who also has been in office since 10 January 2022 and has been assigned the portfolios of Public Housing and Spatial Planning.

1801–1866

1866–1945

Since 1945

List of Ministers without Portfolio

List of State Secretaries for the Interior

See also
 Ministry of the Interior and Kingdom Relations
 List of Ministers of Kingdom Relations of the Netherlands

References

Interior